Kay Oldham Cornelius (14 January 1933 – 23 January 2017) was a published author with more than a dozen novels to her credit. She also wrote test units for the PSAT and College Board specialized-subject achievement tests, as well as reviewing the Board's English literature examination.

Cornelius was a teacher, mostly in the English department at Virgil I. Grissom High School in Huntsville, Alabama, for the majority of her 34-year teaching career. Her first novel, Love's Gentle Journey, was published in 1985. Cornelius retired from teaching to write full-time in 1990.

Cornelius was a member of the Romance Writers of America, Authors Guild, National League of American PEN Women, Alabama Writers Conclave, Alabama Writers Forum, Phi Delta Kappa, and Delta Kappa Gamma.

Partial bibliography
 Love's Gentle Journey, (October 1985, Zondervan Publishing Company)
 More Than Conquerors, (January 1994, Heartsong Presents)
 Sign Of The Bow, (September 1994, Heartsong Presents)
 Sign Of The Eagle, (1994, Heartsong Presents)
 Sign Of The Dove, (1995, Heartsong Presents)
 A Matter of Security, (1995, Barbour Publishing Co.)
 Sign Of The Spirit, (1995, Heartsong Presents)
 Politically Correct, (1996, Heartsong Presents)
 A Nostalgic Noel, (September 1998, Barbour Publishing Co.)
 Twin Willows, (February 1999, Barbour Publishing Co.)
 The Supreme Court, (February 2000, Chelsea House Publishers)
 Chamique Holdsclaw (Women Who Win), (September 2000, Chelsea House Publishers)
 Francis Marion: The Swamp Fox, (December 2000, Chelsea House Publishers)
 Edgar Allan Poe, (2002, Chelsea House Publishers)
 Emily Dickinson, (2002, Chelsea House Publishers)
 Pennsylvania (novella collection), (May 2002, Barbour Publishing Co.)
 Toni's Vow, (January 2004, Heartsong Presents)
 Anita's Fortune, (February 2004, Heartsong Presents)
 Mary's Choice, (August 2004, Barbour Publishing Co.)
 Alabama (novel collection), (February 2005, Barbour Publishing Co.)
 Summons To The Chateau D'Arc, (August 2005, Five Star Expressions)

References

1933 births
2017 deaths
20th-century American novelists
21st-century American novelists
American women novelists
Writers from Huntsville, Alabama
Novelists from Alabama
20th-century American women writers
21st-century American women writers